Samba Diallo may refer to:
Samba Diallo (boxer) (born 1958), Senegalese boxer
Samba Diallo (footballer) (born 2003), Senegalese footballer